Michelmersh Court is a former rectory in the village of Michelmersh in Hampshire, southern England. A Grade II* listed building, it is now a private house.

Built in the late 18th century, it was altered and extended in the 19th and 20th centuries.

It was bought by the broadcaster David Frost in the 1980s. He hosted such people as Margaret Thatcher and former United States President George H. W. Bush at Michelmersh Court.

References

Clergy houses in England
Queen Anne architecture in the United Kingdom
Country houses in Hampshire
Grade II* listed buildings in Hampshire
Grade II* listed houses